Codpa is a village located  to the south of Arica, in the Chilean commune of Camarones in the region of Arica and Parinacota, Chile.

It is a small village of Hispanic origin, located in a mountain range with a tempered climate and well-known pure water. Its narrow valley is exceedingly fertile, suitable for most types of fruit trees, particularly guava. Famous for its pintatani wine, Codpa has been the traditional place of rest for Arica. The Church of San Martín de Tours was an important misional center in the Spanish colonization of the Americas. A few miles from Codpa are the petroglyphs at Ofragia.
Codpa is an Aymaran word meaning "pedestal".

References

Populated places in Arica Province